Hércules Corrêa Torres (born 25 March 1940), known as just Hércules, is a Brazilian former footballer.

References

1940 births
Living people
Association football defenders
Brazilian footballers
Fluminense FC players
Pan American Games medalists in football
Pan American Games silver medalists for Brazil
Footballers at the 1959 Pan American Games
Medalists at the 1959 Pan American Games